John Campbell McTiernan Jr. (born January 8, 1951) is an American filmmaker. He is best known for his action films, especially Predator (1987), Die Hard (1988), and The Hunt for Red October (1990). His later well-known films include the action-comedy-fantasy film Last Action Hero (1993), the action film sequel Die Hard with a Vengeance (1995), the heist-film remake The Thomas Crown Affair (1999), and The 13th Warrior (1999). His last completed feature film was the mystery-thriller Basic, released in 2003.

He pleaded guilty to perjury and lying to an FBI investigator in regard to his hiring of the private investigator Anthony Pellicano in late 2000 to illegally wiretap the phone calls of two people, one of whom was Charles Roven, a co-producer of his action film remake Rollerball (2002). He was incarcerated in federal prison from April 2013 to February 2014. During his imprisonment, he filed for bankruptcy amidst foreclosure proceedings for his large ranch residence.

Early life and education
McTiernan was born in Albany, New York, the son of Myra and John Campbell McTiernan Sr., a lawyer and actor. He attended the Juilliard School before graduating with a Master of Fine Arts from the AFI Conservatory in 1975.

Career

Early career
In 1986, he wrote and directed his first feature film, Nomads, starring Pierce Brosnan (Brosnan's first lead role in a film). It was not well received by critics, receiving only one positive review out of eight according to the review aggregator site Rotten Tomatoes. Roger Ebert of the Chicago Sun-Times rated it 1.5 stars out of four and said that even if viewers cared about the characters, the film is too confusing to understand. Variety wrote, "Nomads avoids the more obvious ripped-guts devices in favor of dramatic visual scares. [...] In fact, everything seems to come naturally in a tale that even has the supernatural ring true." Walter Goodman of The New York Times called the Innuat "as menacing as the chorus from West Side Story". In his memoir, Total Recall, Arnold Schwarzenegger said he was so impressed by the film's tense atmosphere made with a low budget that he hired McTiernan to direct Predator.

The budget for sci-fi Predator was around $15m. It opened as #1 at the U.S. box office with a gross of $12m on just its opening weekend, and went on to gross nearly $100m overall. In 1987, its domestic grosses were second only to Beverly Hills Cop II. Initial critical reaction to Predator was negative, with criticism focusing on the thin plot. Metacritic, which assigns a score out of 100 to reviews, rates the film with an average score of 45 based on 15 reviews, with the review opinions summarized as "mixed". Elvis Mitchell of The New York Times described it as "grisly and dull, with few surprises". Dean Lamanna wrote in Cinefantastique that "the militarized monster movie tires under its own derivative weight." Variety wrote that the film was a "slightly above-average actioner that tries to compensate for tissue-thin plot with ever-more-grisly death sequences and impressive special effects." However, in subsequent years critics' attitudes toward the film warmed, and it has appeared on "best of" lists. The review aggregator site Rotten Tomatoes reports that 78% of 40 surveyed critics gave the film a positive review.

Made on a $28m budget, Die Hard went on to gross over $140m theatrically worldwide. It is considered one of the greatest action films. The film's success spawned a Die Hard franchise, which so far has included four sequels, video games, and a comic book. It received very high ratings from critics. English film critic Mark Kermode expressed admiration for the film, calling it an exciting setup of "Cowboys and Indians in The Towering Inferno". The film has been included in various top-ten lists of best Christmas movies, including Empire (rating it #1), Entertainment Weekly (rating it #4), Forbes (rating it #1), The Guardian (rating it #8), and San Francisco Gate (rating it #1). However, not every critic praised it. Roger Ebert gave it a mere two stars out of four and criticized the stupidity of the deputy police chief character, saying that "all by himself he successfully undermines the last half of the movie".

1990–1995
The Hunt for Red October also received positive reviews from critics. Nick Schager, for Slant Magazine, called the film "a thrilling edge-of-your-seat trifle that has admirably withstood the test of time". Ebert called it "a skillful, efficient film that involves us in the clever and deceptive game being played", while Gene Siskel commented on the film's technical achievement and Baldwin's convincing portrayal of the character Jack Ryan.

McTiernan directed Medicine Man (1992), about a medical researcher in a rainforest, starring Sean Connery. Medicine Man was poorly received. Roger Ebert gave it one-and-a-half stars, saying that although the film had "some beautiful moments", it never really came together and had "a cornball conclusion". Entertainment Weekly said the story was "built around some very tired devices" and especially criticized the performance of the female lead.

In 1993, he directed and co-produced Last Action Hero, an action-comedy vehicle for Arnold Schwarzenegger. The film received mixed to negative reviews from critics. Entertainment Weekly said it was "a stupid, generic slab of action bombast that keeps reminding us it's a stupid, generic slab of action bombast" and called it "a lead balloon of a movie". Variety called it a "a joyless, soulless machine of a movie, an $80 million-plus mishmash". Vincent Canby likened the film to "a two-hour Saturday Night Live sketch" and called it "something of a mess, but a frequently enjoyable one". Roger Ebert gave the film 2.5 stars out of 4, writing that despite some entertaining moments Last Action Hero more often "plays more like a bright idea than like a movie that was thought through".

In 1995, McTiernan rebounded with Die Hard with a Vengeance, the third installment of the Die Hard film series. It was highly successful garnering $366m in box office receipts and becoming the highest-grossing film of the year, although the film had mixed reviews by critics. Owen Gleiberman of Entertainment Weekly said that while "McTiernan stages individual sequences with great finesse... they don't add up to a taut, dread-ridden whole." James Berardinelli said the explosions and fights were "filmed with consummate skill, and are thrilling in their own right." Desson Howe of The Washington Post said "the best thing about the movie is the relationship between McClane and Zeus", saying that Samuel L. Jackson was "almost as good as he was in Pulp Fiction". Ebert gave the film a positive review, praising the action sequences and the performances of Willis, Jackson, and Jeremy Irons, concluding: "Die Hard with a Vengeance is basically a wind-up action toy, cleverly made, and delivered with high energy. It delivers just what it advertises, with a vengeance." Empire magazine's Ian Nathan gave the film a 3/5-star review stating that "Die Hard With A Vengeance is better than Die Hard 2, but not as good as the peerless original. Though it's breathless fun, the film runs out of steam in the last act. And Jeremy Irons' villain isn't fit to tie Alan Rickman's shoelaces."

Later career
From 1995 to 1997, McTiernan was a producer for several smaller projects, including at least three films that were not major releases The Right to Remain Silent (a made-for-television film), Amanda, and Quicksilver Highway (a made-for-television film).

He directed The 13th Warrior (1999), a loose retelling of the tale of Beowulf starring Antonio Banderas, Diane Venora and Omar Sharif that was adapted from the novel Eaters of the Dead by Michael Crichton. The film did poorly at the box office, with a total loss estimated at $70–130 million. It received generally mixed-to-poor reviews. Roger Ebert gave the film one and a half stars out of four, saying that it "lumber[s] from one expensive set-piece to the next without taking the time to tell a story that might make us care." Conversely, James Berardinelli gave it three stars out of four, calling it "a solid offering" that "delivers an exhilarating 100 minutes". The outcome disappointed Sharif so much that he temporarily retired from film acting, saying "After my small role in The 13th Warrior, I said to myself, 'Let us stop this nonsense, these meal tickets that we do because it pays well. Sharif said it was "terrifying to have to do the dialogue from bad scripts, to face a director who does not know what he is doing, in a film so bad that it is not even worth exploring." The Thomas Crown Affair, directed by McTiernan a heist-film remake starring Pierce Brosnan and Rene Russo, which opened to solid reviews and strong box office results, was released later the same year.

McTiernan then directed the 2002 film Rollerball, a science fiction remake starring Chris Klein, Jean Reno, and LL Cool J. Rollerball was heavily panned by critics. Time Out's Trevor Johnson described it as "a checklist shaped by a 15-year-old mallrat: thrashing metal track, skateboards, motorbikes, cracked heads and Rebecca Romijn with her top off", and Ebert called it "an incoherent mess, a jumble of footage in search of plot, meaning, rhythm and sense". The film was a box-office flop, earning a worldwide total of $26m compared to a production budget of $70m. In 2014, the Los Angeles Times listed the film as one of the most expensive box office flops of all time.

, his most recent feature film project was the 2003 thriller Basic with John Travolta and Samuel L. Jackson. Reviews for Basic were mostly negative. Roger Ebert gave it one star out of four, saying it was "not a film that could be understood" and that "If I were to see it again and again, I might be able to extract an underlying logic from it, but the problem is, when a movie's not worth seeing twice, it had better get the job done the first time through." Leonard Maltin's Movie Guide gave it two stars out of four and said the film "keeps adding layers of confusion so that it becomes less interesting as it goes along! The final 'twist' seems to negate the entire story, like a bad shaggy-dog joke."

His career was derailed in 2006 because of legal problems which saw McTiernan spend time in prison. As a result of his conviction, The Hollywood Reporter called McTiernan one of Hollywood's most "despised" people. His short film, The Red Dot, was released by Ubisoft to advertise the 2017 video game Tom Clancy's Ghost Recon Wildlands. It was the first of several action-oriented shorts to support the video game. The Red Dot was his first film project in 14 years.

Personal life

Criminal charges, felony conviction, and incarceration
On April 3, 2006, McTiernan was charged in federal court with making a false statement to an FBI investigator in February 2006 about his hiring of the private investigator Anthony Pellicano to illegally wiretap Charles Roven, the producer of his film Rollerball, around August 2000. McTiernan had been in a disagreement with Roven about what type of film Rollerball should be, and had hired Pellicano to investigate Roven's intentions and actions. He had asked Pellicano to try to find instances where Roven made negative remarks about the studio executives or said things to others that were inconsistent with what he said to the studio.

McTiernan was arraigned and pleaded guilty on April 17, 2006, as part of an initial plea bargain agreement to cooperate with prosecutors in exchange for lenient treatment. Prosecutors said they then became convinced that he was continuing to lie to them, and that he had also hired Pellicano to wiretap someone else, prompting them to seek a prison sentence. McTiernan then hired new counsel and tried to withdraw his guilty plea, saying that his prior counsel had not conducted a proper discovery in the case and had not presented him with the available defense approach of suppressing as evidence the conversation with him that Pellicano had recorded on August 17, 2000. However, this bid was denied by the Federal District Judge, Dale S. Fischer, who immediately proceeded to sentence him to four months in prison and $100,000 in fines. The judge characterized McTiernan as someone who thought he was "above the law", had shown no remorse, and "lived a privileged life and simply wants to continue that". He was ordered to surrender for incarceration by January 15, 2008, but was allowed to remain out of prison on bail pending an appeal to the Ninth Circuit Court of Appeals.

In October 2008, the Ninth Circuit Court of Appeals vacated McTiernan's four-month sentence and ruled that Judge Fischer had erred and he was entitled to a hearing as to whether his plea could be withdrawn. The prosecution (and the judge) then agreed to allow McTiernan to withdraw his plea rather than proceed with such a hearing, and his plea was withdrawn on February 24, 2009.

With the case reopened, the prosecution was no longer bound by the prior plea agreement, and filed additional charges against McTiernan; he faced another two counts of lying to the FBI (one for claiming he had hired Pellicano only in connection with his divorce proceedings and another for denying he had ever discussed wiretapping with Pellicano) and one count of committing perjury during the previous court proceedings by denying he had been coached by his attorney on what to say during his previous guilty plea hearing (a denial that he later stated in a declaration was false). 

After some adverse rulings on his attempted defense arguments, and facing the possibility of a prison sentence of more than five years from the various charges, McTiernan eventually entered another guilty plea (on all three counts) in a second plea bargain in 2010, conditioned on his plan to appeal the earlier rulings against his defense approach, and Judge Fischer sentenced him to one year in prison, three years of supervised probation, and a fine of $100,000. The judge said that the increased length of the prison sentence was related to the additional, more serious charge of perjury before her court, that McTiernan's crimes were more than just a momentary lapse of judgment, that he still did not seem to have really accepted responsibility for his actions, and that she would have issued an even more lengthy prison sentence if the prosecution had not recommended less. McTiernan was then released on bail pending an appeal of the adverse rulings.

On August 20, 2012, the Ninth Circuit Court of Appeals affirmed the district court judgment, but allowed McTiernan to address the U.S. Supreme Court regarding his attempt to suppress the recorded conversation before being required to report to prison. His defense tried to argue that Pellicano had made the recording for an unlawful purpose and that this made it inadmissible, but the district and appeals courts disagreed with that interpretation of the rules of evidence. On January 14, 2013, the Supreme Court declined to hear the case.

McTiernan surrendered to federal prison on April 3, 2013, to serve a stated 12-month sentence in the Federal Prison Camp, Yankton, in Yankton, South Dakota, a minimum-security former college campus holding about 800 male inmates, most of whom were white-collar criminals. His Bureau of Prisons registration number was 43029-112. Although the Yankton facility was rated by Forbes magazine as one of "America's 10 cushiest prisons", McTiernan's wife Gail stated that he had found it hard to adapt, having lost ; she also claimed that he was suffering from depression, and was "disintegrating" emotionally. While in prison, McTiernan managed to write a possible sequel for The Thomas Crown Affair, with the working title Thomas Crown and the Missing Lioness. His supporters created a "Free John McTiernan" campaign page on Facebook, including expressions of support from Samuel L. Jackson, Alec Baldwin and Brad Bird. He was released from prison on February 25, 2014, after 328 days of incarceration, to serve the remainder of his 12-month prison sentence under house arrest at his ranch home in Wyoming until April 3, 2014.

Invasion of privacy civil suit
On July 3, 2006, McTiernan's former wife, film producer Donna Dubrow, filed suit against him for invasion of privacy and other claims arising from her belief that he hired Pellicano to wiretap her telephone during their divorce negotiations. The lawsuit continued over time, and was still pending as of October 2015.

Debts and bankruptcy

In October 2013, while in prison, McTiernan filed for chapter 11 bankruptcy amidst foreclosure proceedings for his  ranch residence in central Wyoming (valued at $8–10M), struggles to pay his past legal bills and IRS tax debts, and ongoing expensive disputes including the lawsuit by his ex-wife, a $5M claim against him of liability in a 2011 automobile accident, and his ongoing effort to reverse his felony conviction.

The bank holding the mortgage on the ranch said the filing was a bad-faith tactic only intended to stall the foreclosure proceedings, and requested the presiding judge to convert the case to a chapter 7 bankruptcy under the terms of which he would lose control of the bankruptcy case and have a trustee appointed to manage his assets, which would result in the liquidation of his assets rather than giving McTiernan the opportunity to attempt to reorganize his debt himself.

McTiernan's lawyers countered by saying that his potential for generating additional future income from new projects could enable him to eventually repay his debts, so a rapid liquidation of assets would be unnecessary and unjustified. In the bankruptcy proceedings, he identified two likely future film projects with Hannibal Pictures, with working titles Red Squad and Warbirds, with large budgets and significant likely future income and planned to star major well-known actors. On December 8, 2015, a judge ruled against McTiernan agreeing with his creditors that his assets should be liquidated. It was reported that his ranch was likely to be sold and that an administrator would take over the management of his future film royalty payments.

Filmography

Awards and nominations

Special awards

References

External links

Finke, Nikki, "Film Director Accused of Lying to FBI in Pellicano Scandal" Deadline Hollywood (LA Weekly), Penske Media Corporation, April 3, 2006.
"Filmmaker Says He Lied in FBI Probe" The Los Angeles Times, April 18, 2006.
"Links Between Pellicano, Director Come Into Focus" The Los Angeles Times, April 5, 2006.

1951 births
Living people
20th-century American screenwriters
21st-century American criminals
AFI Conservatory alumni
Film directors from New York (state)
Film producers from New York (state)
American perjurers
Juilliard School alumni
Businesspeople from Albany, New York
Action film directors
Science fiction film directors
American prisoners and detainees
American people of Irish descent
People convicted of making false statements